The Desouk Bridge is a steel truss bridge carrying the railway across the Lower Nile in Desouk, Egypt.

History
The bridge was built between 1925 and 1927 by Dorman Long: it is 610 meters long.

References

Railway bridges in Egypt
Bridges completed in 1927
Desouk
Swing bridges
Truss bridges